Live at Wembley Arena is an album of live recordings by Swedish pop group ABBA, released by Polar Music on 26 September 2014, on 2 CD, 3 LP and digital format.

The album, produced by Ludvig Andersson, includes the complete concert at London's Wembley Arena (now The SSE Arena, Wembley) on 10 November 1979, the last of a six-night residency at the famous venue.

It features most of ABBA's hit singles and album favourites from their first eight years as a unit, as well as the never-before-released "I'm Still Alive", written by Agnetha Fältskog and Björn Ulvaeus.

Overview

ABBA played to packed crowds at London's Wembley Arena from 5 to 10 November, as part of their North American and European Tour of 1979, also known as ABBA: The Tour. Band members Björn Ulvaeus and Agnetha Fältskog agreed that those concerts were the highlight of the tour. Music stars such as The Clash's Joe Strummer and Ian Dury were among the audience.

Several songs from the Wembley concerts were filmed for the TV special ABBA in Concert, broadcast the following year. The song "The Way Old Friends Do", performed during the encore, resurfaced as the closing track of their 1980 album Super Trouper. Songs from Wembley also appeared on 1986's ABBA Live, but were overdubbed in the studio by producer and sound engineer Michael B. Tretow. The BBC compiled its own one-hour version of the concerts and aired it on Christmas 1979. This circulates as a bootleg entitled "ABBA - Live In London".

In an interview with the webpage Ice the Site, in December 2013, songwriter and pianist Benny Andersson confirmed that a live album would be released "exactly as it was" sometime in 2014, as part of the band's 40th anniversary. Andersson detailed that his son Ludvig went through hours of tapes, choosing the right material. Ludvig selected the November 10th 1979 concert to be released. The decision was approved by all the members of ABBA, including Fältskog and Anni-Frid Lyngstad, who listened to it at a studio in Stockholm.

On June 9, 2014, ABBA's official Facebook and Instagram accounts confirmed the release. The next day, June 10, the full track list was revealed.

The album omits the song "Not Bad At All", performed on tour by backing vocalist and fellow Swedish pop singer Tomas Ledin.

Track listing
All tracks written by Benny Andersson and Björn Ulvaeus except where noted.

Notes
 signifies arranged by

Personnel
ABBA
Agnetha Fältskog – vocals, keyboards
Anni-Frid Lyngstad – vocals
Björn Ulvaeus – acoustic guitars, vocals
Benny Andersson – synthesizers, keyboards, accordion, vocals

Additional musicians
Ola Brunkert – drums
Anders Eljas – keyboards
Rutger Gunnarsson – bass
Mats Ronander – guitars
Åke Sundqvist – percussion
Lasse Wellander – guitars
Tomas Ledin – backing vocals
Birgitta Wollgård – backing vocals
Liza Öhman – backing vocals

Producer: Ludvig Andersson
Engineer: Bernard Löhr (mixing), Filip Lindholm (assistant)
Mastering: Björn Engelmann

Charts

Certifications

References

External links
 ABBA – Live at Wembley Arena - news from ABBA The official site

2014 live albums
ABBA live albums
Live albums by Swedish artists
Live albums recorded in London